Alastor sanctus is a species of wasp in the family Vespidae.

References

sanctus